Guy Mann-Dude is an American musician who was best known in the late 1980s and early 1990s after his eponymous band formed in Los Angeles, California in 1988.  He played guitar for the Michael Angelo Band before going solo and was part of the supergroup The Dudes of Wrath in 1989. He worked as a musician and producer in Czechoslovakia in the early 1990s, collaborating with Miloš "Dodo" Doležal on two albums.

Biography
Born Guy Shiffman, he was a professional drummer for ten years before getting into heavy metal. He toured with the lead singer of Yes, Jon Anderson, for his 1982 Animation Tour. Although an accomplished drummer doing studio work and leading his own bands, Shiffman turned to his first love — the guitar — and re-invented himself to land a record deal with MCA. He subbed for Vinnie Colaiuta on drums and years later played guitar with him for a jingle.

In 1989, he was part of the heavy metal supergroup The Dudes of Wrath along with Paul Stanley of Kiss and Desmond Child, both on vocals, Vivian Campbell on guitar, Whitesnake's Rudy Sarzo on bass guitar, and Mötley Crüe's Tommy Lee on drums. The group was specially assembled to record a song called "Shocker" from the film of the same name.
Shiffman also worked as a studio guitarist and played on Robin Beck's album Trouble or Nothin' in 1989.

In the 1990s, Shiffman studied jazz and classical piano with Terry Trotter. He went on to score cartoons, movie shorts, and a film.

Shiffman met Czech guitarist Miloš "Dodo" Doležal in Los Angeles while the latter was studying there, and Doležal invited him to return to Czechoslovakia with him. Shiffman contributed to Doležal's second solo album Dráždivý Dotek (1992) and in 1994, they recorded an album together, titled Miloš Dodo Doležal/Guy Mann-Dude, which included drums by well-known session drummer Gregg Bissonette. Shiffman produced a few bands in the Eastern European nation, and his album Mannic Distortion was recorded and issued there. Shiffman's son, Wyatt Mann, lives in the Czech Republic.

Discography
Studio albums
 Sleight of Hand (1989)
 Mannic Distortion (1991)

Other albums
 Miloš Dodo Doležal/Guy Mann-Dude (1994)

Notable contributions
 Alice Cooper - Trash (1989) tracks 2, 4, & 7
 Robin Beck - Trouble or Nothin' (1989)
 Miloš "Dodo" Doležal - Dráždivý Dotek (1992)

References

Year of birth missing (living people)
Living people
American heavy metal guitarists
American male singers
American heavy metal singers
American male guitarists